A godson is a male godchild.

Godson or The Godson may also refer to: 
 Godson (surname)
 The Godson (film), a 1998 American comedy film
 "The Godson" (short story), a story by Leo Tolstoy
 Le Samouraï, a 1967 French crime film released as The Godson in English
 Loongson, a brand of CPU chips

See also
 Goodson (disambiguation)